The Battle of Kombi was a decisive battle in the war between Ndongo-Matamba and Portugal during the Dutch period of Angolan history.

Background
When the Dutch forces occupied Luanda in 1641, the capital of the Portuguese colony of Angola, the neighbouring countries of Kongo and Ndongo had welcomed them, sending embassies and receiving promises of assistance in driving the Portuguese out of the colony and central Africa.  However, following the initial Dutch success, the Portuguese had fallen back into their interior positions, first at Bengo, where they were driven out, and then to the Fort Nossa Senhora da Vitória at Massangano.  In 1643, deciding it was not worthwhile to continue the war with Portugal, the Dutch signed an agreement which effectively left Portugal in command of the interior presidios.  However, the kingdom of Ndongo, a longtime enemy of Portuguese ambitions, then led by Queen Njinga  fought on against the Portuguese without Dutch help.  Following her defeat at Kavanga in 1646, however, the situation was sufficiently grave that the Dutch commander decided to commit forces to her support.

Thus, in 1647 a combined force from Kongo, Ndongo, and a Dutch contingent of 400 soldiers, adding to over 8,000 men, met the Portuguese and their African allies with a field army of some 30,000 soldiers, including 600 Portuguese and Luso-Africans, somewhere north of Massangano (the battlefield has not yet been located). The Portuguese and their allies were routed by the Dutch and their allied Africans and over 3,000 men of the Portuguese army were killed or wounded.

As a result of this victory, Nzinga and her army were able to lay siege to three of the Portuguese presidios in Angola, Ambaca, Masangano and Muxima. These sieges were not successful, largely because neither she nor her Dutch allies possessed sufficient artillery to conduct an attack, even though the number of the Portuguese did not exceed 300.  When the forces of Salvador de Sá e Benevides arrived in 1648, Njinga was forced to abandon the siege and return to her headquarters in Matamba.

References

Sources
António Oliveira de Cadornega, História geral das guerras angolanas (1680) 3 vols. Lisbon:  Agencia geral do Ultramar, 1940-42 (reprinted 1972)
Anonymous, "Extract van seekeren brief, gheschreven uyt Loando..." in S. P. L'Honoré Naber, "Nota van Pieter Moortamer over het gewest Angola..." Bijdragen en Medeelingen van het Historisch Genootschap 54 (1933): 41-42.

Kombi
Kombi
Kombi
Kombi
Conflicts in 1647
1640s in Africa
1647 in Africa